Else Wildhagen (née Friedrich-Friedrich, 10 January 1863, Leipzig – 9 August 1944, Leipzig) was a German writer. She was the daughter of the author of Der Trotzkopf, Emmy von Rhoden, and the writer, Hermann Friedrich Friedrich. She was married to the German jurist, Georg Wildhagen, since 1885.

Works
As a writer, she was the author of the three sequels of her mother's masterpiece, Der Trotzkopf.

 Trotzkopfs Brautzeit
 Aus Trotzkopfs Ehe
 Trotzkopfs Nachkommen

Her mother's main work as well as the further stories that she published influenced children's literature in the Netherlands as well.

References

External links 
 Else Wildhagen at German National Library

1863 births
1944 deaths
19th-century German women writers
German children's writers